Hussein Mohamoud Jiciir is a Somali politician and is the former Mayor of Hargeisa from 2003 to 2012 and holds the title of the longest-serving mayor of Hargeisa for roughly 10 years and one of the longest-serving mayors in Somaliland as a whole. He hails from the Eidagale sub-division of the Garhajis Isaaq clan.

References

Living people
Mayors of Hargeisa
Year of birth missing (living people)